White Airways S.A. (also known as White) is a Portuguese charter airline headquartered in Porto Salvo, Oeiras. It mainly operates charter flights from Lisbon Humberto Delgado Airport on behalf of tour operators as well as on lease on behalf of other airlines.

History

The airline was founded in 2000, originally as Yes - Linhas Aéreas Charter under a joint venture with TAP Air Portugal (75%) and Abreu Group (25%). It commenced operations in June 2000 with a leased Lockheed L-1011-500.

In late 2006, the airline was acquired by the Omni Aviation and rebranded as White Airways and focused on carrying out ACMI operations on behalf of other airlines.

In May 2016, White Airways phased out their last Airbus A310-300 as one of the last European operators of the type.

In October 2022, TAP Air Portugal announced it would end its wetlease contract with White Airways citing insufficient dispatch reliability. This was later disputed by White Airways, as the maintenance was performed by Portugália, which is a subsidiary of TAP itself.

Destinations

Fleet

Current fleet

As of January 2023, the White fleet consists of the following aircraft:

Former fleet

Accidents and incidents
On July 6, 2018, an ATR 72-600 (registered CS-DJG) operated on behalf of TAP Express made a hard landing at Fès–Saïs Airport, during which the tail impacted the runway. The aircraft made a return flight to Lisbon an hour later with 55 passengers on board, with the captain apparently failing to notice visible damage to the tail during the pre-flight walkaround. While there were no injuries, the final report of the Portuguese Aviation Accidents Prevention and Investigation Department criticized both the flight crew and the operator for their shortcomings during the landing, organisational culture, failure to conduct an effective pre-flight inspection before the return flight, and failure to make a legally required report of the accident.

See also
List of airlines of Portugal

References

External links

Official website

Airlines established in 2000
Portuguese companies established in 2000
Airlines of Portugal
Portuguese brands